

Events

Pre-1600
 180 – Twelve inhabitants of Scillium (near Kasserine, modern-day Tunisia) in North Africa are executed for being Christians. This is the earliest record of Christianity in that part of the world.
1048 – Damasus II is elected pope, and dies 23 days later.
1203 – The Fourth Crusade assaults Constantinople. The Byzantine emperor Alexios III Angelos flees from his capital into exile.
1402 – Zhu Di, better known by his era name as the Yongle Emperor, assumes the throne over the Ming dynasty of China.
1429 – Hundred Years' War: Charles VII of France is crowned the King of France in the Reims Cathedral after a successful campaign by Joan of Arc.
1453 – Battle of Castillon: The last battle of Hundred Years' War, the French under Jean Bureau defeat the English under the Earl of Shrewsbury, who is killed in the battle in Gascony.

1601–1900
1717 – King George I of Great Britain sails down the River Thames with a barge of 50 musicians, where George Frideric Handel's Water Music is premiered.
1762 – Former emperor Peter III of Russia is murdered.
1771 – Bloody Falls massacre: Chipewyan chief Matonabbee, traveling as the guide to Samuel Hearne on his Arctic overland journey, massacres a group of unsuspecting Inuit.
1791 – Members of the French National Guard under the command of General Lafayette open fire on a crowd of radical Jacobins at the Champ de Mars, Paris, during the French Revolution, killing scores of people.
1794 – The 16 Carmelite Martyrs of Compiègne are executed ten days prior to the end of the French Revolution's Reign of Terror.
1821 – The Kingdom of Spain cedes the territory of Florida to the United States.
1850 – Vega became the first star (other than the Sun) to be photographed.
1867 – Harvard School of Dental Medicine is established in Boston, Massachusetts. It is the first dental school in the U.S. that is affiliated with a university.
1899 – NEC Corporation is organized as the first Japanese joint venture with foreign capital.

1901–present
1901 – Liner  sets east to west transatlantic record of five days, eleven hours and five minutes. 
1902 – Willis Carrier creates the first air conditioner in Buffalo, New York.
1917 – King George V issues a Proclamation stating that the male line descendants of the British Royal Family will bear the surname Windsor.
1918 – Tsar Nicholas II of Russia and his immediate family and retainers are executed by Bolshevik Chekists at the Ipatiev House in Yekaterinburg, Russia.
1919 – The form of government in the Republic of Finland is officially confirmed. For this reason, July 17 is known as the Day of Democracy (Kansanvallan päivä) in Finland.
1932 – Altona Bloody Sunday: A riot between the Nazi Party paramilitary forces, the SS and SA, and the German Communist Party ensues.
1936 – Spanish Civil War: An Armed Forces rebellion against the recently elected leftist Popular Front government of Spain starts the civil war.
1938 – Douglas Corrigan takes off from Brooklyn to fly the "wrong way" to Ireland and becomes known as "Wrong Way" Corrigan.
1944 – Port Chicago disaster: Near the San Francisco Bay, two ships laden with ammunition for the war explode in Port Chicago, California, killing 320.
  1944   – World War II: At Sainte-Foy-de-Montgommery in Normandy Field Marshal Erwin Rommel is seriously injured by allied aircraft while returning to his headquarters.
1945 – World War II: The main three leaders of the Allied nations, Winston Churchill, Harry S. Truman and Joseph Stalin, meet in the German city of Potsdam to decide the future of a defeated Germany.
1953 – The largest number of United States midshipman casualties in a single event results from an aircraft crash in Florida, killing 44.
1955 – Disneyland is dedicated and opened by Walt Disney in Anaheim, California.
1962 – Nuclear weapons testing: The "Small Boy" test shot Little Feller I becomes the last atmospheric test detonation at the Nevada National Security Site.
1968 – Abdul Rahman Arif is overthrown and the Ba'ath Party is installed as the governing power in Iraq with Ahmed Hassan al-Bakr as the new Iraqi President.
1973 – King Mohammed Zahir Shah of Afghanistan, while having surgery in Italy, is deposed by his cousin Mohammed Daoud Khan.
1975 – Apollo–Soyuz Test Project: An American Apollo and a Soviet Soyuz spacecraft dock with each other in orbit marking the first such link-up between spacecraft from the two nations.
1976 – East Timor is annexed and becomes the 27th province of Indonesia.
  1976   – The opening of the Summer Olympics in Montreal is marred by 25 African teams boycotting the games because of New Zealand's participation. Contrary to rulings by other international sports organizations, the IOC had declined to exclude New Zealand because of their participation in South African sporting events during apartheid.
1979 – Nicaraguan dictator General Anastasio Somoza Debayle resigns and flees to Miami, Florida, United States.
1981 – A structural failure leads to the collapse of a walkway at the Hyatt Regency in Kansas City, Missouri, killing 114 people and injuring more than 200.
1984 – The national drinking age in the United States was changed from 18 to 21.
1985 – Founding of the EUREKA Network by former head of states François Mitterrand (France) and Helmut Kohl (Germany).
1989 – First flight of the B-2 Spirit Stealth Bomber.
  1989   – Holy See–Poland relations are restored.
1996 – TWA Flight 800: Off the coast of Long Island, New York, a Paris-bound TWA Boeing 747 explodes, killing all 230 on board.
1998 – The 7.0  Papua New Guinea earthquake triggers a tsunami that destroys ten villages in Papua New Guinea, killing up to 2,700 people, and leaving several thousand injured.
  1998   – A diplomatic conference adopts the Rome Statute of the International Criminal Court, establishing a permanent international court to prosecute individuals for genocide, crimes against humanity, war crimes, and the crime of aggression.
2000 – During approach to Lok Nayak Jayaprakash Airport, Alliance Air Flight 7412 suddenly crashes into a residential neighborhood in Patna, killing 60 people.
2001 – Concorde is brought back into service nearly a year after the July 2000 crash.
2006 – The 7.7  Pangandaran tsunami earthquake severely affects the Indonesian island of Java, killing 668 people, and leaving more than 9,000 injured.
2007 – TAM Airlines Flight 3054, an Airbus A320, crashes into a warehouse after landing too fast and missing the end of the São Paulo–Congonhas Airport runway, killing 199 people.
2014 – Malaysia Airlines Flight 17, a Boeing 777, crashes near the border of Ukraine and Russia after being shot down. All 298 people on board are killed.
  2014   – A French regional train on the Pau-Bayonne line crashes into a high-speed train near the town of Denguin, resulting in at least 25 injuries.
2015 – At least 120 people are killed and 130 injured by a suicide bombing in Diyala Governorate, Iraq.
2018 – Scott S. Sheppard announces that his team has discovered a dozen irregular moons of Jupiter.

Births

Pre-1600
1487 – Ismail I of Iran (d. 1524)
1499 – Maria Salviati, Italian noblewoman (d. 1543)
1531 – Antoine de Créqui Canaples, Roman Catholic cardinal (d. 1574)

1601–1900
1674 – Isaac Watts, English hymnwriter and theologian (d. 1748)
1695 – Christian Karl Reinhard of Leiningen-Dachsburg-Falkenburg-Heidesheim (d. 1766)
1698 – Pierre Louis Maupertuis, French mathematician and philosopher (d. 1759)
1708 – Frederick Christian, Margrave of Brandenburg-Bayreuth (d. 1769)
1714 – Alexander Gottlieb Baumgarten, German philosopher and academic (d. 1762)
1744 – Elbridge Gerry, American merchant and politician, 5th Vice President of the United States (d. 1814)
1763 – John Jacob Astor, German-American businessman and philanthropist (d. 1848)
1774 – John Wilbur, American minister and theologian (d. 1856)
1797 – Paul Delaroche, French painter and academic (d. 1856)
1823 – Leander Clark, American businessman, judge, and politician (d. 1910)
1831 – Xianfeng Emperor of China (d. 1861)
1837 – Joseph-Alfred Mousseau, Canadian lawyer, judge, and politician, 7th Secretary of State for Canada (d. 1886)
1839 – Ephraim Shay, American engineer, invented the Shay locomotive (d. 1916)
1853 – Alexius Meinong, Ukrainian-Austrian philosopher and academic (d. 1920)
1868 – Henri Nathansen, Danish director and playwright (d. 1944)
1870 – Charles Davidson Dunbar, Scottish soldier and bagpipe player (d. 1939)
1871 – Lyonel Feininger, German-American painter and illustrator (d. 1956)
1879 – Jack Laviolette, Canadian ice hockey player, coach, and manager (d. 1960)
1882 – James Somerville, English admiral and politician, Lord Lieutenant of Somerset (d. 1949)
1888 – Shmuel Yosef Agnon, Ukrainian-Israeli novelist, short story writer and poet, Nobel Prize laureate (d. 1970)
1889 – Erle Stanley Gardner, American lawyer and author (d. 1970)
1894 – Georges Lemaître, Belgian priest, astronomer, and cosmologist (d. 1966)
1896 – Rupert Atkinson, English RAF officer (d. 1919)
1898 – Berenice Abbott, American photographer (d. 1991)
  1898   – Osmond Borradaile, Canadian soldier and cinematographer (d. 1999)
1899 – James Cagney, American actor and dancer (d. 1986)

1901–present
1901 – Luigi Chinetti, Italian-American race car driver (d. 1994)
  1901   – Bruno Jasieński, Polish poet and author (d. 1938)
  1901   – Patrick Smith, Irish farmer and politician, Minister for Agriculture, Food and the Marine (d. 1982)
1902 – Christina Stead, Australian author and academic (d. 1983)
1905 – William Gargan, American actor (d. 1979)
1910 – James Coyne, Canadian lawyer and banker, 2nd Governor of the Bank of Canada (d. 2012)
  1910   – Frank Olson, American chemist and microbiologist (d. 1953)
1911 – Lionel Ferbos, American trumpet player (d. 2014)
  1911   – Heinz Lehmann, German-Canadian psychiatrist and academic (d. 1999)
1912 – Erwin Bauer, German race car driver (d. 1958)
  1912   – Art Linkletter, Canadian-American radio and television host (d. 2010)
1913 – Bertrand Goldberg, American architect, designed the Marina City Building (d. 1997)
1914 – Eleanor Steber, American soprano and educator (d. 1990)
1915 – Bijon Bhattacharya, Indian actor, singer, and screenwriter (d. 1978)
  1915   – Arthur Rothstein, American photographer and educator (d. 1985)
  1916 – Eleanor Hadley, American economist and policymaker (d. 2007)
1917 – Lou Boudreau, American baseball player and manager (d. 2001)
  1917   – Phyllis Diller, American actress, comedian, and voice artist (d. 2012)
  1917   – Kenan Evren, Turkish general and politician, 7th President of Turkey (d. 2015)
  1917   – Christiane Rochefort, French author (d. 1998)
1918 – Carlos Manuel Arana Osorio, Guatemalan soldier and politician, President of Guatemala (d. 2003)
  1918   – Red Sovine, American singer-songwriter and guitarist (d. 1980)
1919 – Albert Stubbins, English footballer (d. 2002)
1920 – Gordon Gould, American physicist and academic, invented the laser (d. 2005)
  1920   – Juan Antonio Samaranch, Spanish businessman, 7th President of the International Olympic Committee (d. 2010)
1921 – George Barnes, American guitarist, producer, and songwriter (d. 1977)
  1921   – Louis Lachenal, French mountaineer (d. 1955)
  1921   – Mary Osborne, American guitarist (d. 1992)
  1921   – Toni Stone, American baseball player (d. 1996)
  1921   – František Zvarík, Slovak actor (d. 2008)
1923 – Jeanne Block, American psychologist (d. 1981)
  1923   – John Cooper, English car designer, co-founded the Cooper Car Company (d. 2000)
1924 – Garde Gardom, Canadian lawyer and politician, 26th Lieutenant Governor of British Columbia (d. 2013)
1925 – Jimmy Scott, American singer and actor (d. 2014)
  1925   – Mohammad Hasan Sharq, Afghan politician
1926 – Édouard Carpentier, French-Canadian wrestler (d. 2010)
  1926   – Willis Carto, American activist and theorist (d. 2015)
1928 – Vince Guaraldi, American singer-songwriter and pianist (d. 1976)
1929 – Sergei K. Godunov, Russian mathematician and academic
1932 – Niccolò Castiglioni, Italian composer (d. 1996)
  1932   – Red Kerr, American basketball player and coach (d. 2009)
  1932   – Wojciech Kilar, Polish pianist and composer (d. 2013)
  1932   – Karla Kuskin, American author and illustrator (d. 2009)
  1932   – Slick Leonard, American basketball player and coach (d. 2021)
  1932   – Ian Moir, Australian rugby league player (d. 1990)
  1932   – Quino, Spanish-Argentinian cartoonist (d. 2020)
  1932   – Hal Riney, American businessman, founded Publicis & Hal Riney (d. 2008)
1933 – Keiko Awaji, Japanese actress (d. 2014)
  1933   – Karmenu Mifsud Bonnici, Maltese politician, 9th Prime Minister of Malta (d. 2022)
  1933   – Tony Pithey, Zimbabwean-South African cricketer (d. 2006)
1934 – Lucio Tan, Chinese-Filipino billionaire businessman and educator
1935 – Diahann Carroll, American actress and singer (d. 2019)
  1935   – Peter Schickele, American composer and educator
  1935   – Donald Sutherland, Canadian actor and producer
1938 – Hermann Huppen, Belgian author and illustrator
1939 – Andrée Champagne, Canadian actress and politician (d. 2020)
  1939   – Spencer Davis, Welsh singer-songwriter and guitarist (d. 2020)
1940 – Tim Brooke-Taylor, English actor and screenwriter (d. 2020)
1941 – Daryle Lamonica, American football player (d. 2022)
  1941   – Bob Taylor, English cricketer
  1941   – Achim Warmbold, German race car driver and manager
1942 – Don Kessinger, American baseball player and manager
  1942   – Gale Garnett, New Zealand–born Canadian singer
  1942   – Connie Hawkins, American basketball player (d. 2017)
  1942   – Zoot Money, English singer-songwriter and keyboard player
1943 – LaVyrle Spencer, American author and educator
1944 – Mark Burgess, New Zealand cricketer and footballer
  1944   – Catherine Schell, Hungarian-English actress
  1944   – Carlos Alberto Torres, Brazilian footballer and manager (d. 2016)
1945 – Alexander, Crown Prince of Yugoslavia
  1945   – John Patten, Baron Patten, English politician, Secretary of State for Education
1946 – Chris Crutcher, American novelist and short story writer
  1946   – Ted Sampley, American POW/MIA activist (d. 2009)
1947 – Joyce Anelay, Baroness Anelay of St John's, English educator and politician
  1947   – Robert Begerau, German footballer and manager
  1947   – Camilla, Queen consort of the United Kingdom
  1947   – Wolfgang Flür, German musician (Kraftwerk)
  1947   – Mick Tucker, English rock drummer (Sweet) (d. 2002)
1948 – Ron Asheton, American guitarist and songwriter (d. 2009)
  1948   – Luc Bondy, Swiss director and producer (d. 2015)
1949 – Geezer Butler, English bass player and songwriter
  1949   – Charley Steiner, American journalist and sportscaster
1950 – Phoebe Snow, American singer-songwriter and guitarist (d. 2011)
  1950   – Tengku Sulaiman Shah, Malaysian corporate figure
  1950   – Sadhan Chandra Majumder, Bangladeshi politician
1951 – Lucie Arnaz, American actress and singer
  1951   – Mark Bowden, American journalist and author
  1951   – Andrew Robathan, English soldier and politician, Minister of State for the Armed Forces
1952 – David Hasselhoff, American actor, singer, and producer
  1952   – Nicolette Larson, American singer-songwriter (d. 1997)
  1952   – Thé Lau, Dutch singer-songwriter and guitarist (d. 2015)
  1952   – Robert R. McCammon, American author
1954 – Angela Merkel, German chemist and politician, Chancellor of Germany from 2005 to 2021.
  1954   – Edward Natapei, Vanuatuan politician, 6th Prime Minister of Vanuatu (d. 2015)
  1954   – J. Michael Straczynski, American author, screenwriter, and producer
1955 – Sylvie Léonard, Canadian actress and screenwriter
  1955   – Paul Stamets, American mycologist and author
1956 – Julie Bishop, Australian lawyer and politician, 38th Australian Minister for Foreign Affairs
  1956   – Bryan Trottier, Canadian-American ice hockey player and coach
1957 – Bruce Crump, American drummer and songwriter (d. 2015)
  1957   – Wendy Freedman, Canadian-American cosmologist and astronomer
1958 – Wong Kar-wai, Chinese director, producer, and screenwriter
  1958   – Suzanne Moore, English journalist
  1958   – Susan Silver, American music manager
  1958   – Thérèse Rein, Australian businesswoman, founded Ingeus
1959 – Pola Uddin, Baroness Uddin, Bangladeshi-English politician
1960 – Kim Barnett, English cricketer and coach
  1960   – Mark Burnett, English-American screenwriter and producer
  1960   – Nancy Giles, American journalist and actress
  1960   – Robin Shou, Hong Kong martial artist and actor
  1960   – Dawn Upshaw, American soprano
  1960   – Jan Wouters, Dutch footballer and manager
1961 – António Costa, Portuguese politician, 119th Prime Minister of Portugal
  1961   – Jeremy Hardy, English comedian and actor (d. 2019)
1963 – Regina Belle, American singer-songwriter, producer, and actress
  1963   – Letsie III of Lesotho
  1963   – Matti Nykänen, Finnish ski jumper and singer (d. 2019)
1964 – Heather Langenkamp, American actress and producer
1965 – Craig Morgan, American singer-songwriter and guitarist
  1965   – Alex Winter, English-American actor, film director and screenwriter
1966 – Lou Barlow, American guitarist and songwriter
  1966   – Sten Tolgfors, Swedish lawyer and politician, 30th Swedish Minister of Defence
1969 – Scott Johnson, American cartoonist
  1969   – Jaan Kirsipuu, Estonian cyclist
1971 – Calbert Cheaney, American basketball player and coach
  1971   – Cory Doctorow, Canadian author and activist
  1971   – Nico Mattan, Belgian cyclist
1972 – Elizabeth Cook, American singer and guitarist
  1972   – Donny Marshall, American basketball player and sportscaster
  1972   – Jason Rullo, American drummer
  1972   – Jaap Stam, Dutch footballer and manager
  1972   – Eric Williams, American basketball player
1973 – Eric Moulds, American football player
1974 – Claudio López, Argentine footballer 
1975 – Andre Adams, New Zealand cricketer
  1975   – Elena Anaya, Spanish actress
  1975   – Darude, Finnish DJ and producer
  1975   – Harlette, Australian-English fashion designer
  1975   – Loretta Harrop, Australian triathlete
  1975   – Konnie Huq, English television presenter
  1975   – Terence Tao, Australian-American mathematician
1976 – Luke Bryan, American singer-songwriter and guitarist
  1976   – Gino D'Acampo, Italian chef and author
  1976   – Dagmara Domińczyk, Polish-American actress
  1976   – Marcos Senna, Brazilian-Spanish footballer
  1976   – Anders Svensson, Swedish footballer and sportscaster
  1976   – Eric Winter, American actor
1977 – Andrew Downton, Australian cricketer
  1977   – Leif Hoste, Belgian cyclist
  1977   – Marc Savard, Canadian ice hockey player
1978 – Ricardo Arona, Brazilian mixed martial artist
  1978   – Panda Bear, American musician and songwriter
  1978   – Jason Jennings, American baseball player
1979 – Mike Vogel, American actor
1980 – Javier Camuñas, Spanish footballer
  1980   – Brett Goldstein, British actor, comedian and writer
  1980   – Ryan Miller, American ice hockey player
1981 – Hely Ollarves, Venezuelan runner
1982 – Omari Banks, Anguillan cricketer
1983 – Adam Lind, American baseball player
1985 – Loui Eriksson, Swedish ice hockey player
  1985   – Neil McGregor, Scottish footballer
1986 – DeAngelo Smith, American football player
1987 – Darius Boyd, Australian rugby league player
  1987   – Jeremih, American singer, songwriter, and record producer
1994 – Kali Uchis, American singer-songwriter
1998 – Rosana Serrano, Cuban rower

Deaths

Pre-1600
 521 – Magnus Felix Ennodius, Gallo-Roman bishop
 855 – Leo IV, pope of the Catholic Church (b. 790)
 952 – Wu Hanyue, Chinese noblewoman (b. 913)
 961 – Du, empress dowager of the Song Dynasty
1070 – Baldwin VI, count of Flanders (b. 1030)
1085 – Robert Guiscard, Norman adventurer
1119 – Baldwin VII, count of Flanders (b. 1093)
1210 – Sverker II, king of Sweden (b. 1210)
1304 – Edmund Mortimer, 2nd Baron Mortimer (b. 1251)
1399 – Jadwiga, queen of Poland (b. 1374)
1453 – Dmitry Shemyaka, Grand Prince of Moscow
  1453   – John Talbot, 1st Earl of Shrewsbury, English commander and politician (b. 1387)
1531 – Hosokawa Takakuni, Japanese commander (b. 1484)
1571 – Georg Fabricius, German poet and historian (b. 1516)
1588 – Mimar Sinan, Ottoman architect and engineer, designed the Sokollu Mehmet Pasha Mosque and Süleymaniye Mosque (b. 1489)

1601–1900
1603 – Mózes Székely, Hungarian noble (b. 1553)
1642 – William, Count of Nassau-Siegen, German count, field marshal of the Dutch State Army (b. 1592)
1645 – Robert Carr, 1st Earl of Somerset, English-Scottish politician, Lord Chamberlain of the United Kingdom (b. 1587)
1704 – Pierre-Charles Le Sueur, French fur trader and explorer (b. 1657)
1709 – Robert Bolling, English planter and merchant (b. 1646)
1725 – Thomas King, English and British soldier, MP for Queenborough, lieutenant-governor of Sheerness (b. before 1660?).
1762 – Peter III of Russia (b. 1728)
1790 – Adam Smith, Scottish economist and philosopher (b. 1723)
1791 – Martin Dobrizhoffer, Austrian missionary and author (b. 1717)
1793 – Charlotte Corday, French murderer (b. 1768)
1794 – John Roebuck, English chemist and businessman (b. 1718)
1845 – Charles Grey, 2nd Earl Grey, English politician, Prime Minister of the United Kingdom (b. 1764)
1871 – Karl Tausig, Polish virtuoso pianist, arranger and composer (b. 1841)
1878 – Aleardo Aleardi, Italian poet and politician (b. 1812)
1879 – Maurycy Gottlieb, Ukrainian-Polish painter (b. 1856)
1881 – Jim Bridger, American scout and explorer (b. 1804)
1883 – Tự Đức, Vietnamese emperor (b. 1829)
1885 – Jean-Charles Chapais, Canadian farmer and politician, 1st Canadian Minister of Agriculture (b. 1811)
1893 – Frederick A. Johnson, American banker and politician (b. 1833)
1894 – Leconte de Lisle, French poet and translator (b. 1818)
  1894   – Josef Hyrtl, Austrian anatomist and biologist (b. 1810)
1900 – Thomas McIlwraith, Scottish-Australian politician, 8th Premier of Queensland (b. 1835)

1901–present
1907 – Hector Malot, French author and critic (b. 1830)
1912 – Henri Poincaré, French mathematician, physicist, and engineer (b. 1854)
1918 – Victims of the Shooting of the Romanov family
                Nicholas II of Russia (b. 1868)
                Alexandra Fyodorovna of Russia (b. 1872)
                Grand Duchess Olga Nikolaevna of Russia (b. 1895)
                Grand Duchess Tatiana Nikolaevna of Russia (b. 1897)
                Grand Duchess Maria Nikolaevna of Russia (b. 1899)
                Grand Duchess Anastasia Nikolaevna of Russia (b. 1901)
                Alexei Nikolaevich, Tsarevich of Russia (b. 1904)
                Anna Demidova (b. 1878)
                Ivan Kharitonov (b. 1872)
                Alexei Trupp (b. 1858)
                Yevgeny Botkin (b. 1865)
1925 – Lovis Corinth, German painter (b. 1858)
1928 – Giovanni Giolitti, Italian politician, 13th Prime Minister of Italy (b. 1842)
  1928   – Álvaro Obregón, Mexican general and politician, 39th President of Mexico (b. 1880)
1932 – Rasmus Rasmussen, Norwegian actor, singer, and director (b. 1862)
1935 – George William Russell, Irish poet and painter (b. 1867)
1942 – Robina Nicol, New Zealand photographer and suffragist (b. 1861)
1944 – William James Sidis, American mathematician and anthropologist (b. 1898)
1945 – Ernst Busch, German field marshal (b. 1885)
1946 – Florence Fuller, South African-born Australian artist (b. 1867)
  1946   – Draža Mihailović, Serbian general (b. 1893)
1950 – Evangeline Booth, English 4th General of The Salvation Army (b. 1865)
  1950   – Antonie Nedošinská, Czech actress (b. 1885)
1959 – Billie Holiday, American singer (b. 1915)
  1959   – Eugene Meyer, American businessman and publisher (b. 1875)
1960 – Maud Menten, Canadian physician and biochemist (b. 1879)
1961 – Ty Cobb, American baseball player and manager (b. 1886)
  1961   – Emin Halid Onat, Turkish architect and academic (b. 1908)
1967 – John Coltrane, American saxophonist and composer (b. 1926)
1974 – Dizzy Dean, American baseball player and sportscaster (b. 1910)
1975 – Konstantine Gamsakhurdia, Georgian author (b. 1893)
1980 – Don "Red" Barry, American actor and screenwriter (b. 1912)
  1980   – Boris Delaunay, Russian mathematician and academic (b. 1890)
1988 – Bruiser Brody, American football player and wrestler (b. 1946)
1989 – Itubwa Amram, Nauruan pastor and politician (b. 1922)
1991 – John Patrick Spiegel, American psychiatrist and academic (b. 1911)
1994 – Jean Borotra, French tennis player (b. 1898)
1995 – Juan Manuel Fangio, Argentinian race car driver (b. 1911)
1996 – Victims of TWA Flight 800
                Michel Breistroff, French ice hockey player (b. 1971)
                Marcel Dadi, Tunisian-French guitarist (b. 1951)
                David Hogan, American composer (b. 1949)
                Jed Johnson, American interior designer and director (b. 1948)
  1996   – Chas Chandler, English bass player and producer (b. 1938)
1998 – Lillian Hoban, American author and illustrator (b. 1925)
2001 – Katharine Graham, American publisher (b. 1917)
2002 – Joseph Luns, Dutch politician and Dutch Minister of Foreign Affairs (b. 1911)
2003 – David Kelly, Welsh weapons inspector (b. 1944)
  2003   – Rosalyn Tureck, American pianist and harpsichord player (b. 1914)
  2003   – Walter Zapp, Latvian-Swiss inventor, invented the Minox (b. 1905)
2005 – Geraldine Fitzgerald, Irish-American actress (b. 1913)
  2005   – Edward Heath, English colonel and politician, Prime Minister of the United Kingdom (b. 1916)
  2005   – Joe Vialls, Australian journalist and theorist (b. 1944)
2006 – Sam Myers, American singer-songwriter (b. 1936)
  2006   – Mickey Spillane, American crime novelist (b. 1918)
2007 – Grant Forsberg, American actor and businessman (b. 1959)
  2007   – Júlio Redecker, Brazilian politician (b. 1956)
  2007   – Paulo Rogério Amoretty Souza, Brazilian lawyer and businessman (b. 1945)
2009 – Walter Cronkite, American journalist and actor (b. 1916)
  2009   – Leszek Kołakowski, Polish historian and philosopher (b. 1927)
2010 – Larry Keith, American actor (b. 1931)
2011 – David Ngoombujarra, Australian actor (b. 1967)
2012 – Richard Evatt, English boxer (b. 1973)
  2012   – Forrest S. McCartney, American general (b. 1931)
  2012   – İlhan Mimaroğlu, Turkish-American composer and producer (b. 1926)
  2012   – William Raspberry, American journalist and academic (b. 1935)
  2012   – Marsha Singh, Indian-English politician (b. 1954)
2013 – Henri Alleg, English-French journalist and author (b. 1921)
  2013   – Peter Appleyard, English-Canadian vibraphone player and composer (b. 1928)
  2013   – Vincenzo Cerami, Italian screenwriter and producer (b. 1940)
  2013   – Don Flye, American tennis player (b. 1933)
  2013   – Ian Gourlay, English general (b. 1920)
  2013   – David White, Scottish footballer and manager (b. 1933)
2014 – Malaysia Airlines Flight 17 victims:
                Liam Davison, Australian author and critic (b. 1957)
                Shuba Jay, Malaysian actress (b. 1976)
                Joep Lange, Dutch physician and academic (b. 1954)
                Willem Witteveen, Dutch scholar and politician (b. 1952)
  2014   – Henry Hartsfield, American colonel, pilot, and astronaut (b. 1933)
  2014   – Otto Piene, German sculptor and academic (b. 1928)
  2014   – Elaine Stritch, American actress and singer (b. 1925)
2015 – Bill Arnsparger, American football player and coach (b. 1926)
  2015   – Jules Bianchi, French race car driver (b. 1989)
  2015   – Owen Chadwick, English rugby player, historian, and academic (b. 1916)
  2015   – Van Miller, American sportscaster (b. 1927)
  2015   – John Taylor, English pianist and educator (b. 1942)
2020 – John Lewis, American Politician and Civil Rights Leader. (b. 1940)
  2020   – Ekaterina Alexandrovskaya, Russian-Australian pair skater (b. 2000)

Holidays and observances
 Christian feast day:
 Alexius of Rome (Western Church)
 Andrew Zorard
 Cynehelm
 Cynllo
 Inácio de Azevedo
 Jadwiga of Poland
 Magnus Felix Ennodius
 Marcellina
 Martyrs of Compiègne
 Blessed Pavel Peter Gojdič (Greek Catholic Church)
 Pope Leo IV
 Romanov sainthood (Russian Orthodox Church)
 Speratus and companions
 William White (Episcopal Church))
 July 17 (Eastern Orthodox liturgics)
 Constitution Day (South Korea)
 Gion Matsuri (Yasaka Shrine, Kyoto)
 Independence Day (Slovakia)
 International Firgun Day (international)
 King's Birthday (Lesotho)
 U Tirot Sing Day (Meghalaya, India)
 World Day for International Justice (International)
 World Emoji Day (International)

References

External links

 
 
 

Days of the year
July